The Curonian colonization of the Americas was performed by the Duchy of Courland (now Latvia), which was the second-smallest state to colonise the Americas, after the Knights of Malta. It had a colony on the island of Tobago from 1654 to 1659 and intermittently from 1660 to 1689.

History

Courland was located in present-day Latvia, and had a population of only 200,000, mostly of Latvian and Baltic German ancestry, and was itself a vassal of the Polish–Lithuanian Commonwealth at that time. Under Duke Jacob Kettler (ruled 1642-1682), a Baltic German, it established one of the largest merchant fleets in Europe, with its main harbours in Windau (today's Ventspils), and Libau (today's Liepāja). During his travels to Western Europe, Duke Jacob became an eager proponent of mercantilism. Metalworking and shipbuilding became much more developed. Trading relations were established not only with nearby countries, but also with England, France, the Netherlands, Portugal and others.

Courland and Tobago
The Duchy's ships started undertaking trade voyages to the West Indies at least as early as 1637, when a Couronian ship attempted to found a colony on Tobago with 212 settlers. An earlier European settlement on the island, a Dutch colony named New Walcheren, formed in 1628, had been wiped out a few months earlier by Spain. The first Curonian colony met a similar end, whilst a second attempt was essentially blockaded by Spain and strangled in infancy by 1639.

In 1642 two ships under Captain Caroon with about 300 settlers attempted to settle on the north coast near Courland Bay. This colony was again blockaded, but proved more successful. Jesuit missionaries among the Carib quickly agitated and armed the tribes to attack the settlement. In 1650 the colonists abandoned the colony, which was evacuated to Tortuga and later Jamaica. Under agreement with other Protestant powers who saw their various individual efforts insufficient to trade and/or colonise the Americas, Africa, and the Indies simultaneously, Courland's attention shifted to Africa. In 1651 the Duchy gained its first successful colony in Africa, on St. Andrews Island in the Gambia River and it established Fort Jacob there.

Soon afterwards the Protestant powers felt sufficiently organised and prepared to launch several colonial expeditions against Spanish interests in the Caribbean. The alliance between England and the Netherlands against Spain began to dissolve thanks to England's attempts to break Dutch monopolies. The Dutch were primary competitors to Courland, which decided to support the English in the brewing conflict. Therefore, Courland received permission from its Protestant English allies to make still another attempt at a colony on Tobago. 

On 20 May 1654, the ship Das Wappen der Herzogin von Kurland ("The Arms of the Duchess of Courland") arrived carrying 45 cannon, 25 officers, 124 Curonian soldiers and 80 families of colonists to occupy Tobago. Captain Willem Mollens declared the island "New Courland" (Neu-Kurland). A fort was erected on the southwest of the island, also called Fort Jacobus (Fort James) with the surrounding town called Jacobsstadt (Jamestown). Other features were given Curonian names such as Great Courland Bay, Jacobs (James) Bay, Courland Estate, Neu-Mitau, Libau Bay and Little Courland Bay. 

In their first year on the island the Curonians built an Evangelical Lutheran church. The colony was successful, but the Netherlands was not willing to accede to losing the West Indies and replied by establishing its own colony nearby a few months later. Thus, the small Curonian colony soon became overshadowed by a second Dutch colony. While 120 Curonian colonists had come in 1657, the Dutch colony reached a population of 1,200 by the next year, when 500 French Protestant refugees fleeing Catholic persecution joined them.

Goods exported to Europe included sugar, tobacco, coffee, cotton, ginger, indigo, rum, cocoa, tortoise shells, tropical birds and their feathers.

The Duchy of Courland became a focus of strategic interest for both Sweden and Poland–Lithuania. In 1655 the Swedish army entered the territory of the Duchy and the Northern Wars (1655–1660) began. The Swedish army held Duke Jacob captive from 1658 to 1660. During this period both colonies continued to thrive until they were taken by the more numerous Dutch settlers, who surrounded Fort James and forced Hubert de Beveren, Governor of the Curonians, to surrender. The merchant fleet and factories were destroyed. Courland officially yielded New Courland on 11 December 1659. However, this war ended with the Treaty of Oliwa (signed near Gdańsk) of 1660, on the basis of which Tobago was returned to Courland. 

Although peace had been established between the Curonians and the Dutch, there still remained Spain. Following several attacks by buccaneers seeking new harbours, and an expeditionary fleet of Spanish vessels, the Curonians left Tobago in 1666. In 1668 a Curonian ship attempted to reoccupy Fort Jacobus and was driven off by the Dutch. 

Tobago was regained again just for a short period at the end of Duke Jacob's rule with an attempt in July 1680 at a new colony which also later failed. He began to restore the fleet and factories, and the Duchy never again reached its previous level of prosperity. The island was abandoned except for visiting buccaneers from March 1683 to June 1686, before again being occupied by a collection of scattered Curonians from throughout the Dutch, French, and English West Indies, as well as by fresh settlers from the home country. 

In May 1690, shortly after the island was sold by Courland the previous year, the Curonian government permanently left Tobago, and those who remained essentially joined the buccaneers or other Anglo-Dutch colonies. Absentee governors would continue to be appointed until 1795, thereby facilitating the continued use of covert privateering Letters of Marque and Reprisal in the region.

The Courland Monument near Courland Bay commemorates the Duchy's settlements.

A final Curonian attempt to establish a Caribbean colony involved a settlement near modern Toco on Trinidad.

Governors of New Courland

Jamaican buccaneers and English forces from Barbados invade by 1666 during the Second Anglo-Dutch War.

French forces from Grenada then capture the island.

The Dutch recapture the island by 1667 and Dutch settlers re-establish the colony by 1668.

The Nepoyo (Arawakans) from Trinidad attack the settlement, but they were able to fend off the attacks with the help of the native Kalina (Carib) of Tobago, but were attacked again by the Kalinago (Island Caribs) from St. Vincent.

At the outbreak of the Third Anglo-Dutch War (1672–1674), the colony was captured and looted again by Barbadians, where in 1673 Adrian Lampsins and the late Cornelius' son Jan briefly again retook Tobago, but the island was recaptured by an English Barbadian force under Sir Tobias Bridge from Barbados, and Adrian was killed alongside his nephew when the fort was blown up.

A new Dutch colony was re-established in 1676.

The French attack again by March 1677, with the resulting naval battle resulted in serious losses on both sides, and the French forces withdrew, but returned the following year, captured the island, and destroyed the settlement.

Fresh Courlander attempts to establish a colony in Tobago in 1680 and 1681 were abandoned in 1683.

New Courland is abandoned from 1683–1686.

A final Courlander attempt to settle the island in 1686 was largely abandoned by 1687.

New Courland is finally sold to the British Empire by around 1690 to 1693, where last mention of the colony was a small group of settlers encountered by a Danish ship in 1693.

See also
Curonian colonisation

References

Further reading
 Edgar Anderson: The Couronians and the West Indies, Chicago 1965.
 Karin Jekabson-Lemanis: Balts in the Caribbean, The Duchy of Courland's attempts to colonize Tobago Island, 1638 to 1654, in: Caribbean Quarterly, Vol. 46, No. 2, 2000, pp. 25–44.
 Harry C. Merritt: The colony of the colonized: the Duchy of Courland’s Tobago colony and contemporary Latvian national identity, in: Nationalities Papers; Vol. 38, No. 4, 2010, pp. 491–508.
 Imbi Sooman, Jesma McFarlane, Valdis Teraudkalns, Stefan Donecker: From the port of Ventspils to Great Courland Bay: The Couronian colony on Tobago in past and present, in: Journal of Baltic Studies, Vol. 44, No. 4, December 2013, pp. 503–526.

European colonization of the Caribbean
Tobago
History of Trinidad and Tobago
 Amer